{{DISPLAYTITLE:C9H19N}}
The molecular formula C9H19N (molar mass: 141.25 g/mol, exact mass: 141.1517 u) may refer to:

 Isometheptene, a sympathomimetic amine
 N-Methylconiine
 Norpropylhexedrine
 2,2,6,6-Tetramethylpiperidine
 Cyclopentamine